Ludlow is a town in Shropshire, England. 

Ludlow may refer to:

Arts and entertainment

 Ludlow, a novel by David Mason about the Ludlow Massacre

Businesses and organisations

Businesses
 Fisher and Ludlow, British car body manufacturing company
 Ludlows, an English bus company that was bought out in 2007

Schools
 Ludlow College, Shropshire, England
 Fairfield Ludlowe High School, Fairfield, Connecticut
 Roger Ludlowe Middle School, Fairfield, Connecticut
 Ludlow High School, Ludlow, Massachusetts
 Ludlow Junior School, Woolston, Southampton, England

People
 Ludlow (name), including a list of people and fictional characters with the surname and given name
 Earl Ludlow, a title in the Peerage of Ireland
 Baron Ludlow, a title in the Peerage of Ireland and in the Peerage of the United Kingdom

Places

Australia
 Ludlow, Western Australia

Canada
 Ludlow Parish, New Brunswick
 Ludlow, New Brunswick

United Kingdom
 Ludlow Rural District, Shropshire, England
 Ludlow (UK Parliament constituency)

United States
 Ludlow, California
 Ludlow, Colorado
 Ludlow, Illinois
 Ludlow, Iowa
 Ludlow, Kentucky
 Ludlow, Maine
 Ludlow, Massachusetts
 Ludlow, Missouri
 Ludlow, Pennsylvania
 Ludlow, Philadelphia, neighborhood
 Ludlow, South Dakota
 Ludlow (town), Vermont
 Ludlow (village), Vermont
 Ludlow Creek, a stream in Ohio
 Ludlow Falls, Ohio
 Ludlow Street, Manhattan, New York City
 Ludlow Township, Allamakee County, Iowa
 Ludlow Township, Champaign County, Illinois
 Ludlow Township, Washington County, Ohio
 Port Ludlow, Washington

Sports
 Ludlow Golf Club, a golf club located near Ludlow, Shropshire, England
 Ludlow Lusitano, a former American soccer club based in Ludlow, Massachusetts
 Ludlow Racecourse, a thoroughbred horse racing venue located near Ludlow, Shropshire
 Ludlow Town F.C., a football club based in Ludlow, Shropshire

Transportation and naval
 Ludlow (Metro-North station), railroad station serving Ludlow Park, Yonkers, New York, United States
 Ludlow railway station, English railway station
 , the name of several American ships
 HMS Ludlow, the name of two British ships

See also

 Ludlow Amendment, a proposed amendment to the United States Constitution
 Ludlow Castle, in Ludlow, Shropshire, England
 Ludlow Castle, Delhi, demolished residency in Delhi, India
 Ludlow epoch, part of the Silurian period in the geologic time scale
 Ludlow Garage, music venue in Cincinnati, Ohio, U.S.
 Ludlow Group, rocks deposited during the Ludlow period of the Silurian in Great Britain
 Ludlow Hospital, serving Ludlow, Shropshire, England
 Ludlow Massacre, during the Colorado Coalfield War in 1914
 Ludlow Massacre (song)
 Ludlow Monument
 Ludlow Street Jail, former American federal prison in New York City
 Ludlow Typograph, a hot metal typesetting system used in letterpress printing
 Ludlow style wall box, a British post box type
 Ludlow's fulvetta, a species of bird in Bhutan, China, India, Myanmar, and Nepal
 Bhutanitis ludlowi, a swallowtail butterfly commonly known as Ludlow's Bhutan swallowtail
 Bishop of Ludlow, a Church of England bishop
 My Lady Ludlow, a novella by Elizabeth Gaskell from 1858
 Fitz Hugh Ludlow Memorial Library, an American library named after Fitz Hugh Ludlow
 Pepperman House, also known as Ludlow House, historic house in Montgomery, Alabama